Jon Blackman (born October 8, 1975) is a former professional American football player. In college, he played tight end at Purdue. He has been a member of the Detroit Lions, Indianapolis Colts, Philadelphia Eagles, and the Las Vegas Outlaws of the XFL. He is a father of two.

Highschool
Jon Blackman attended Yorkville High School. He was named #1 prospect by the Chicago Sun Times and Most Valuable Player in the Little Seven Conference his senior season(93). Blackman also was a member of the basketball team earning 2nd team all state honors as a sophomore averaging 23 points 15 rebounds per game.

Professional career

Detroit Lions
On April 27, 1998 Jon Blackman was signed as an undrafted free agent. He was waived by the Detroit Lions on August 4, 1998.

Indianapolis Colts
On September 7, 1998 he was signed to the Indianapolis Colts practice squad. Was signed to active roster on December 1, 1998

Philadelphia Eagles
Blackman signed as a free agent by the Philadelphia Eagles in 1999.

Las Vegas Outlaws
Blackman was drafted in the 2000 XFL Supplemental draft by the Las Vegas Outlaws. His position was changed from tight end to offensive tackle.

References

 http://www.nfl.com/player/jonblackman/2499662/profile
 http://www.all-xfl.com/lasvegasoutlaws/team/roster/jonblackman.htm

1975 births
Living people
Detroit Lions players
Indianapolis Colts
Las Vegas Outlaws (XFL) players
Philadelphia Eagles
Purdue Boilermakers football players
People from Yorkville, Illinois
Players of American football from Illinois